Costa di Rovigo is a comune (municipality) in the Province of Rovigo in the Italian region Veneto, located about  southwest of Venice and about  southwest of Rovigo.

Costa di Rovigo borders the following municipalities: Arquà Polesine, Fratta Polesine, Rovigo, Villamarzana, Villanova del Ghebbo.

References

External links 

 Official website

Cities and towns in Veneto